Gususan Library is a library located at Daegu in South Korea. The library consists of a basement and three floors.

The establishment of the library was completed on January 21, 2009, and the opening ceremony was held on May 25, 2009.

External links 
  

Libraries in Daegu
Buk District, Daegu
Library buildings completed in 2009
2009 establishments in South Korea
Libraries established in 2009